Kappa Aurigae, Latinised from κ Aurigae, is the Bayer designation for a star in the northern constellation of Auriga. It is visible to the naked eye with an apparent visual magnitude of 4.3.

This is an evolved giant star with a stellar classification of G8.5 IIIb. It is a red clump star, which means it is towards the cool end of the horizontal branch and is generating energy through the fusion of helium at its core. Kappa Aurigae has expanded to 11 times the radius of the Sun and shines with 54 times the Sun's luminosity. At this heat, the star glows with the orange hue of a G-type star.

References

References
 HR 2219
 Image Kappa Aurigae

G-type giants
Horizontal-branch stars
Auriga (constellation)
J06152269+2929535
Aurigae, Kappa
Durchmusterung objects
Aurigae, 44
043039
029696
2219